Valley View High School is a public high school located in the Riverside city of Moreno Valley, California and is part of the Moreno Valley Unified School District. The official school colors are red, white, and black. The school's mascots are the Eagles.

It is the Performing Arts Magnet for the district, a department which includes band, theater, choir, and dance. Other activities include sports teams such as soccer, swimming, football, volleyball, basketball, golf, tennis, cheer, wrestling, track and field, cross country and clubs including Anime Club, Art Club, Eco Club, National Honor Society, among others. One attraction to Valley View is VVHS's Journalism/Advanced Journalism class, which was started when the school first opened. The class is run by Jaqueline Caza, who became the yearbook advisor in 2016. It is also a Yearbook class and gives the students many applicable life skills.

Crimson Regiment Band and Guard 
The Crimson Regiment marching band has made notable achievements in the past, such as: placing 3rd in the 1999 WBA Championships in the 5A (the highest class) and taking Sweepstakes in both the parade and field show competition at the 2000 Tostitos Fiesta Bowl. The program underwent changes after the 1999–2000 season. The Crimson Regiment also performed at 2004 Nokia Sugar Bowl. The Crimson Regiment won the title of AAA Champions in the WBA circuit in 2004.

More recently, this award-winning band has been recovering from decline. Membership has slowly increased, and the band now competes at an AAA class competitive level. After a four-year hiatus, the band has started production of marching field shows under the direction of Loren Gamarra with "Nightwatch." They performed their show titled "In The Grid" and their 2016-2017 show was titled "Let's Dance" in the 2015–2016 season. 2017-2018 show was titled "Impressions" there 2018-2019 show was titled "24601"

2020-2021 The band had to halt competitions due to COVID-19 restrictions. 
In 2021-2022 they came back for a field show titled “Twilight Zone” and went under a new director, Andrew Silva, during the winter season.
They came back in 2022-2023 with their field show titled “Under the Big Top”

Regional Occupancy Program 
Valley View High School also has a notable R.O.P (Regional Occupancy Program) Floral class that has been on the campus for many years and has started the Eco Club program, which has collected cans and bottles and donated the money from the bottles to children in Africa.

Notable alumni
 Ryan Madson, Major League Baseball pitcher
 Davetta Sherwood, actress and musician
 Kyle Turley, former professional football player
 Derrick Ward, former professional football player
 Marcus Slaughter, professional basketball player
 Steven Wright, professional baseball player
Zak Knutson, actor, director, producer
Willie James, Pro baseball athlete, actor and pro baseball trainer

References

External links
 Official website
 

High schools in Riverside County, California
Public high schools in California